The Automobile Competition Committee for the United States (ACCUS) is an umbrella organization of auto racing sanctioning bodies in the United States. It is the official liaison of U.S. sanctioning bodies to the Fédération Internationale de l'Automobile. It was founded in 1957 to take over FIA representation when the American Automobile Association withdrew from racing and dissolved the AAA Contest Board. ACCUS processes international competition licenses for drivers in the U.S. and provides homologation and record keeping. ACCUS is also responsible for the inspection process and the issuance of FIA Historic Technical Passports (HTP) for competitors wishing to take part in International Historic events sanctioned by FIA worldwide.

Member clubs
The member clubs are:
INDYCAR, LLC (IndyCar; 1997–present)
International Motor Sports Association, LLC (IMSA; 1973–present)
National Association for Stock Car Racing, LLC (NASCAR; 1957–present)
National Hot Rod Association (NHRA; 1965–present)
Sports Car Club of America (SCCA; 1957–present)
United States Auto Club (USAC); 1957–present)

Former member clubs
Championship Auto Racing Teams (CART/Champ Car)
Grand American Road Racing Association (Grand-Am)

References

External links
Official site

Auto racing organizations in the United States
National sporting authorities of the FIA
Companies based in Denver